En La Cumbre is a studio album by Rigo Tovar and the band Costa Azul.

Track listing
 Recordando Monterrey
 Cuando Tu Cariño
 La Mucura
 Me Voy a Perder
 El Parrandero Enamorado
 Noche de Cumbia
 Mi Amiga, Mi Esposa y Mi Amante
 Mi Tinajita
 Palmeras
 Yo No Fui 

1974 albums